Shea's Hippodrome was a historic film and play theatre in Toronto, Ontario, Canada. The Hippodrome was located in downtown Toronto, at the southwest corner of Albert and Bay streets (now Nathan Phillips Square). At its opening in 1914, it was the largest movie palace in Canada, and one of the largest vaudeville theatres in the world. The Hippodrome included 12 opera boxes, a Wurlitzer organ, as well as a full-size orchestra pit. It debuted some of Canada's first non-silent films. It was built by brothers Jerry and Michael Shea and situated directly across from Toronto's (now former) City Hall. The Hippodrome was operated by Famous Players and managed for decades by Leonard N. Bishop. It was demolished in 1957 to make way for Toronto's new City Hall.

Venue
Prior to building Shea's Hippodrome, the Shea brothers first took over and operated the former Robinson's Musee Theatre (also known as the "Bijou") as "Shea's Yonge Street" (also known as the "Strand") in 1899. The brothers then built "Shea's Victoria" nearby.

Shea's Hippodrome was constructed in the Renaissance style, with arched (and 'electrified') ceilings. The theatre featured an allegorical painting by George Brant, and uniquely included a coin-operated candy dispenser. Historically, a hippodrome is a large, circular ancient Greek theatre. Though Shea's Hippodrome was not round, the word was sometimes adopted for large theatres at the time.

Before installing a Wurlitzer organ in 1926,
Shea's included an Orchestron machine, a punch-tape programmed precursor to a modern synthesizer. House organists included Kathleen Stokes, Colin Corbett, Quentin Maclean and Al Bollington.

Vaudeville
'The Hipp' was on the Family Time, and later the Super Time, vaudeville circuits. It hosted many of the world's greatest vaudeville acts, including:
 Bob Hope
 Edgar Bergen
 George Burns
 Gracie Allen
 Red Skelton
 Bennie Fields
 Blossom Seeley
 Jimmy Durante
 Ben Blue
 Helen Kane
 Jack Benny
 Maurice Chevalier
 Fanny Brice
 Burns & Allen
 George Jessel
 Guy Lombardo 
 Cab Calloway

Talkies
In 1924, Shea's debuted its first 'talkie' – a non-silent film, called a 'phonofilm'. The first talkie was called The Studio Murder Mystery. Originally thought to be a novelty, talkies later became the main source of income for supporting the declining vaudeville revenue.

Over the years, Shea's screened films such as The Ten Commandments and many of Elvis Presley's movies. In 1941, the Abbott and Costello film Buck Privates played for a record 14 weeks.

Closing
Shea's Hippodrome was one of the last remaining vaudeville theatres in North America to remain open after World War II. The theatre closed just after Christmas in 1957. The last film to play at Shea's was Elvis Presley's Loving You. The Wurlitzer organ was sold to Maple Leaf Gardens (and later sold to Casa Loma).
Though closed, the building was not demolished for some time, and Toronto's replacement 'civic center' was not completed until 1965.

Further reading
 Palaces of the Night, Canada’s Grand Theatres, by John Lindsay.
 The development and nature of vaudeville in Toronto: from 1899 to 1915, by Gerald Lenton.

References

Former cinemas in Toronto
Buildings and structures demolished in 1957
Demolished buildings and structures in Toronto